In September 2020, the Army realigned the previously consolidated CIO/G-6 function into two separate roles, CIO and Deputy Chief of Staff, G-6, that report to the secretary of the Army and chief of staff of the Army, respectively. The realignment came after several months of planning and coordination. Lt. Gen. John Morrison was nominated to the Senate for promotion and assignment as the G-6 and confirmed, assuming that position in August 2020. The Department of the Army appointed Raj Iyer to serve as the chief information officer in November 2020.

The United States Army chief information officer/G-6 (CIO/G-6) previously was a dual role, reporting both to the secretary of the Army as CIO, and also to the chief of staff of the Army as G-6. The roles were realigned in 2020.

As CIO
Report directly to the secretary of the Army
Set strategic direction and objectives for LandWarNet
Supervise Army command, control, communications, computers, and IT (C4IT)
Manage enterprise IT architecture
Direct delivery of C4IT in support of warfighting and enterprise requirements
Assess and ensure compliance of IT security and national security systems

As G-6
Advise chief of staff of the Army on planning, fielding, and execution of C4IT worldwide Army operations
Develop and execute the plan for the Global Enterprise Network
Implement Army information assurance
Supervise C4IT, Signal support, Information security, Force structure and equipping activities in support of warfighting operations
Oversee management of the Signal forces

Planned realignment
On June 11, 2020, the Army announced that the two roles of CIO and Deputy Chief of Staff, G-6 (DCS, G-6) would be realigned no later than August 31, 2020 with separate individuals responsible for each position. With the realignment: 
CIO core functions will be policy, governance, and oversight. Focus areas include: Information Environment, Cybersecurity, Enterprise Architecture, and Data Policy/Oversight/Governance, Enterprise Architecture, Enterprise Cloud Management and IT Spend/Category Management. 
DCS, G-6 core functions will be planning, strategy, and implementation. Focus areas include: Information Environment/Network, Planning and Integration, Theater Synchronization, Architecture Integration, Enterprise Information Environment (EIE) Mission Area Portfolio Management and Mission Decision Packet Management.
 In order to support Multi-domain operations, the Army will have to connect Enterprise networks and tactical networks. —LTG Morrison, DCS, G-6

Chief Information Officer of the US Army 
Raj Iyer, SES 2020–2023
Dr. David Markowitz, CDAO and acting CIO

Chief signal officers and their successors
Chief signal officers (1860–1964)

Maj. Albert J. Myer 1860–1863
Lt. Col. William J. L. Nicodemus 1863–1864
Col. Benjamin F. Fisher 1864–1866
Col. Albert J. Myer 1866–1880 (promoted to brigadier general 16 June 1880)
Brig. Gen. William B. Hazen 1880–1887
Brig. Gen. Adolphus W. Greely 1887–1906
Brig. Gen. James Allen 1906–1913
Brig. Gen. George P. Scriven 1913–1917
Brig. Gen. George O. Squier 1917–1923 (promoted to major general 6 October 1917)
Maj. Gen. Charles McK. Saltzman 1924–1928
Maj. Gen. George Sabin Gibbs 1928–1931
Maj. Gen. Irving J. Carr 1931–1934
Maj. Gen. James B. Allison 1935–1937
Maj. Gen. Joseph O. Mauborgne 1937–1941
Maj. Gen. Dawson Olmstead 1941–1943
Maj. Gen. Harry C. Ingles 1943–1947
Maj. Gen. Spencer B. Akin 1947–1951
Maj. Gen. George I. Back 1951–1955
Lt. Gen. James D. O’Connell 1955–1959
Maj. Gen. Ralph T. Nelson 1959–1962
Maj. Gen. Earle F. Cook 1962–1963
Maj. Gen. David Parker Gibbs 1963–1964

Chiefs of communications-electronics (1964–1967)
Maj. Gen. David Parker Gibbs 1964–1966
Maj. Gen. Walter E. Lotz, Jr. 1966–1967

Assistant chiefs of staff for communications-electronics (1967–1974)
Maj. Gen. Walter E. Lotz, Jr. 1967–1968
Maj. Gen. George E. Pickett 1968–1972
Lt. Gen. Thomas Rienzi 1972–1974

Directors of telecommunications and command and control (1974–1978)(a directorate of ODCSOPS)
Lt. Gen. Thomas Rienzi 1974–1977
Lt. Gen. Charles R. Myer 1977–1978

Assistant chiefs of staff for automation and communications (1978–1981)
Lt. Gen. Charles R. Myer 1978–1979
Maj. Gen. Clay T. Buckingham 1979–1981

Assistant deputy chiefs of staff for operations and plans (command, control, communications, and computers) (1981–1984)
Maj. Gen. Clay T. Buckingham 1981–1982
Maj. Gen. James M. Rockwell 1982–1984

Assistant chiefs of staff for information management (1984–1987)
Lt. Gen. David K. Doyle 1984–1986
Lt. Gen. Thurman D. Rodgers 1986–1987

Directors of information systems for command, control, communications, and computers
Lt. Gen. Thurman D. Rodgers 1987–1988
Lt. Gen. Bruce R. Harris 1988–1990
Lt. Gen. Jerome B. Hilmes 1990–1992
Lt. Gen. Peter A. Kind 1992–1994
Lt. Gen. Otto J. Guenther 1995–1997
Lt. Gen. William H. Campbell

Chief Information Officer, Military Deputy to the Army Acquisition Executive, and Director of Information Systems for Command, Control, Communications and Computers
Lt. Gen. William H. Campbell 1997–2000

External links
Army CIO Website
Army G-6 Website

Notes

Department of the Army staff
Military communications
Command and control
Cloud computing